Neptis katama is a butterfly in the family Nymphalidae. It is found in Kenya (the Aberdare Range and Nyambeni Hills).

References

Butterflies described in 1991
katama
Endemic insects of Kenya
Butterflies of Africa